Sofie Lundin (born 15 February 2000) is a Swedish ice hockey player and member of the Swedish national ice hockey team, currently playing with Djurgårdens IF Hockey of the Swedish Women's Hockey League (SDHL).

She represented Sweden at the 2019 IIHF Women's World Championship.

References

External links

2000 births
Living people
Sportspeople from Helsingborg
Swedish women's ice hockey forwards
Djurgårdens IF Hockey Dam players
Ice hockey players at the 2016 Winter Youth Olympics
Youth Olympic gold medalists for Sweden
Olympic ice hockey players of Sweden
Ice hockey players at the 2022 Winter Olympics